Rosenery Mello do Nascimento (Rio de Janeiro, 1965 – Rio de Janeiro, 4 June 2011), best known by the stage name Rosenery Mello, was a Brazilian celebrity and model also known as "Fogueteira do Maracanã" ("Maracanã Firecracker-Thrower"). During a World Cup qualifier in 1989 between the national teams of Brazil and Chile at Maracanã Stadium, Mello threw a  firework, which landed about a yard away from Chilean goalkeeper Roberto Rojas. Rojas then deliberately cut himself with a razor hidden in his glove in a failed attempt to have the match awarded to Chile. The event became known as El Maracanazo.

In November 1989, Mello was on the cover of men's magazine Playboy. She died of a brain aneurysm on 4 June 2011 in Rio de Janeiro.

References 

Brazilian female models
People from Rio de Janeiro (city)
1990s Playboy Playmates
Association football controversies
1965 births
2011 deaths
Deaths from intracranial aneurysm